Ducey-Les Chéris is a commune in the department of Manche, northwestern France.

Geography

History

The municipality was established on 1 January 2016 by merger of the former communes of Ducey (the seat) and Les Chéris.
The communes of Ducey and Les Chéris become delegated communes.

Administration

See also 
Communes of the Manche department

References 

Communes of Manche
Populated places established in 2016
2016 establishments in France